Ortega is a Spanish surname. A baptismal record in 1570 records a de Ortega "from the village of Ortega". There were several villages of this name in Spain. The toponym derives from Latin urtica, meaning "nettle".

Some of the Ortega spelling variants are Ortega, Ortego, de Ortega, Ortegada, Ortegal, Hortega, Ortiga, Ortigueda, Ortigueira, Ortigosa, Orreaga, etc. A cognate surname in Italian  is Ortica, in Romanian Urzică, in French Ortie, all from Latin urtica.

Origin

Roberto Faure, coauthor of the Diccionario de Apellidos Españoles, states that Ortega is derived from the noun ortega, a spelling variant of the modern Castilian Spanish ortiga "nettle". The name of the plant is found as a toponym in various places in Spain, such as Ortega (Burgos), Ortega (Jaén) or Ortega (Monfero, A Coruña). Mexican author Gutierre Tibón advanced the alternative theory that the name derives from Ortún, earlier Fortún, from the Latin name Fortunius with an added suffix "-eca". The Dictionary of American Surnames additionally states that the name may derive from ortega: "black grouse."

The first Bishop of Almería, Juan de Ortega, died in the early 16th century, while another early occurrence is found in the baptismal record of Phelpa de Ortega, dated 2 March 1570 at Santa Maria Magdalena, Valladolid, Spain, during the reign of King Philip II of Spain. Other early records are found in Carrión de los Condes, Palencia. The name subsequently appears throughout Spain, especially in Castile, Andalusia and Murcia, as well as México and Latin America.

According to the Diccionario de Heráldica Aragonesa by Bizén d'O Río Martínez, there were two Aragonese lines using the surname, one of which was infanzon. Both lines originated in Cinco Villas and bore coats of arms that were variants of each other.  One line is in Gallur in the 18th century, and in Tauste in the 19th century. The other is attested from 1626 in various locations in Aragón.

Coats of arms

There were three arms-bearing families called Ortega. Their coat of arms were as follows:
In a field of blue, six bands of gold and a red border of gules with 10 saltire crosses of gold.
Divided horizontally,  a gold fleur de lis on a blue background on the left side, and a black wheel on a gold background on the right.  The entire shield has a silver border decorated with black ermine marks. These Ortegas were found primarily in Aragón at Gallur, Tauste, and originating in the Cinco Villas.
Divided in quarters, with the gold fleur de lis on blue in the upper left and lower right, and the black wheel on gold in upper right and lower left. This shield also has the silver ermine border. The full coat of arms includes a helmet with three ostrich feathers and an armored arm holding a sword, above a crown of the Count. These Ortegas came from the Carrión de los Condes in the province of Palencia, moving to Castresana de Losa in the province of Burgos, all in the autonomous community of Castile-Leon, later branching to other autonomous communities in Spain. This coat of arms can be found among the Ortegas in the New World, a line bearing titles of Condes de Ortigueira y Monterroso, Valle de Oploca y Santa María de Guadalupe del Peñasco.

People named Ortega

Politicians
Carlos Ortega (born c. 1945), Venezuelan union and political leader
Cynthia Ortega (b. 1956), Dutch politician
Daniel Ortega (born 1945), past and present President of Nicaragua
Humberto Ortega (born 1947), Nicaraguan military leader
Ivonne Ortega (born 1972), governor of Yucatán
Jesús Ortega (born 1952), Mexican left-wing politician
José Francisco Ortega, (1734–1798), soldier and early settler of California
Juan Ortega y Montañés (1627–1708), Spanish bishop and colonial administrator
Katherine D. Ortega (born 1934), 38th treasurer of the United States
Luisa Ortega Diaz (born c. 1958), Venezuelan lawyer

Artists and entertainers
Anthony Ortega (musician) (1928–2022), American jazz musician
Aniceto Ortega (1825-1875), Mexican physician, composer and pianist
Armando Ortega, Mexican composer, conductor, singer, painter
Ashley Ortega (born 1998), Filipina actress and professional figure skater
Cris Ortega (born 1980), Spanish artist and writer
Emanuel Ortega, Argentine singer
Fernando Ortega (born 1957), American singer-songwriter
Frank Ortega, (1927-1994), American pianist, composer, arranger
Gilberto Hernández Ortega (1924–1978), a Dominican painter
Jeannie Ortega (born 1986), American actress, dancer and songwriter
Jenna Ortega (born 2002), American actress
José Gómez Ortega (1895–1920), Spanish bullfighter
José Ortega Cano (born 1953), Spanish bullfighter
Kenny Ortega (born 1950), American producer, director and choreographer
Lindi Ortega (born 1980), Canadian singer-songwriter
Leanor Ortega, former member of the group Five Iron Frenzy
Manuel Ortega (painter) (1921–2014), Spanish painter
Manuel Ortega (singer) (born 1980), Austrian-Spanish singer
Micah Ortega (born 1976), former guitarist of the group Five Iron Frenzy
Palito Ortega (born 1941), Argentinian singer
Santos Ortega (1899–1976), American actor
Sergio Ortega (composer) (1938–2003), Chilean composer and pianist
Ysabel Ortega (born 1999), Filipina actress, dancer, and commercial model

Sportsmen and sportswomen
Anita Ortega, UCLA basketball player
Anthony Ortega (baseball), Venezuelan baseball pitcher
Antonio Carlos Ortega, Spanish Olympic handball player
Ariel Ortega (born 1974), Argentinian soccer player
Brian Ortega (born 1991), Mexican-American UFC Fighter
Buck Ortega (born 1981), American football player
Francisco Ortega (born 1996), Argentinian soccer player
Francisco Ortega (born 1999), Argentinian soccer player
José Ortega (baseball) (born 1988), Venezuelan baseball pitcher
José Ortega (boxer) (born 1963), Spanish boxer
José Ortega Cano (born 1953), Spanish bullfighter
Manuel Ortega Ocaña (born 1981), Spanish cyclist
Mauricio Ortega (discus thrower) (born 1994), Colombian discus thrower
Mauricio Ortega (cyclist) (born 1980), Colombian road cyclist
Oliver Ortega (born 1996), Dominican Republic professional baseball player
Orlando Ortega (born 1991), Cuban-born Spanish track and field athlete
Rafael Ortega (baseball), Venezuelan baseball player
Roberto Ortega Olmedo (born 1991), Spanish tennis player
Stefan Ortega (born 1992), German footballer
Víctor Ortega (born 1988), diver from Colombia

Other people
Aurelio Ortega y Placeres "El Grande" (1863-1926), Mexican educator, founder of school, principal, and publisher
Amancio Ortega Gaona (born 1936), Spanish fashion entrepreneur
Antonio Ortega (colonel), Spanish Republican military leader and football club president
Casimiro Gómez Ortega (1741-1818), Spanish physician and botanist
Gregoria Ortega, American activist nun
Jaime Lucas Ortega y Alamino (1936–2019), Archbishop of Havana
José Francisco Ortega (1734–1798), Spanish soldier and explorer with the 1769 Portola expedition
José Ortega y Gasset (1883–1955), Spanish philosopher
José Ortega Spottorno (1916–2002), Spanish journalist and publisher
José Ortega Torres (born 1943), poet
Joshua Ortega (born 1974), American author and journalist
Liliana Ortega (born 1965), Venezuelan professor, and human rights lawyer and advocate
Lourdes Ortega (born 1968), linguist
Luis Ortega Álvarez (1953–2015), Spanish judge
Rogelio Ortega (chess player) (1915-1980), Cuban chess player
Tony Ortega, American journalist and blogger
Yoselyn Ortega, Dominican-born American nanny accused in the stabbing Deaths of Lucia and Leo Krim in 2012.

Fictional characters
Christian "Combo" Ortega in the TV series Breaking Bad
Gael Ortega, in the TV series 24
Ismael Ortega, in the Marvel Comics series District X
Ortega, father of the hero in Dragon Warrior III
Ortega (Castlevania), a character from the Nintendo 64 video game Castlevania
Victor Ortega, a character from the Sega/Super NES video game Saturday Night Slam Masters
The henchman in The Incredibly Strange Creatures Who Stopped Living and Became Mixed-Up Zombies who would later become a recurring guest character in Mystery Science Theater 3000
Ortega Peru, a character from Mr. Magoo (film)(1997)
Captain Ortega, in the TV series The Snorks
Serge Ortega, in the Well of Souls novel series by Jack L. Chalker
Susan Ortega, anchorwoman in the movie Bruce Almighty
The Ortegas, Neverborn hunters led by Perdita Ortega in the tabletop game Malifaux
Paz Ortega Andrade, a character from Metal Gear Solid by Hideo Kojima

References

Gutierre Tibón: "Origen, Vida y Milagros de su Apellido (1946)," "Diccionario Etimologico Comparado De Nombres Propios De Personas (1986)"
Casa Editora de Genalogia Ibero Americana, A. B. (S. A.)
Roberto Faure: Diccionario de Apellidos Españoles
Bizén d'O Río Martínez: Diccionario de Heráldica Aragonesa
Bernard L. Fontana: "Entrada: The Legacy of Spain and Mexico in the United States"
Rick McCallister and Silvia McCallister-Castillo: Found under Etruscan in "Compilation and translations from French, Italian and Latin (1999)"

External links
Ortega Surname
Histories
redaragon.com
Ortega History in México
Paseo genealógico por la Argentina y Bolivia by Juan Isidro Quesada (google books)
Ortega y Pérez Gallardo, D. Ricardo

Spanish-language surnames